CA Sports is a Pakistani sports equipment manufacturing company headquartered in Sialkot, Punjab, focused on cricket clothing and equipment. Founded in 1958, the company's name refers to the first initials of its founder's name, Charaghdin Abdul Rasheed.

The range of cricket products manufactured by CA Sports include on-field equipment (bat, batting gloves, balls, leg pads, protection guards), clothing (shirts, trousers, raincoats, hoodies, polo shirts), athletic shoes, and accessories (bags, backpacks).

CA Sports have been the official kit sponsor of Pakistan national cricket team, producing and supplying clothing to Pakistan cricket team. The curve-shaped bats, a staple in today’s cricket, were first produced by CA in 1979.

Sponsorships
CA Sports has had sponsorship deals with many international cricketers, including former England captain Eoin Morgan, Jason Roy, Tillakaratne Dilshan, Tamim Iqbal and many other cricketers

References

External links
 

Sportswear brands
Pakistani brands
Companies based in Sialkot
Cricket equipment manufacturers
Sporting goods manufacturers of Pakistan
Clothing companies established in 1958
1958 establishments in Pakistan
Privately held companies of Pakistan